Charles Stafford was a New Zealand cricketer. He played three first-class matches for Auckland in 1884/85.

See also
 List of Auckland representative cricketers

References

External links
 

Year of birth missing
Year of death missing
New Zealand cricketers
Auckland cricketers
Place of birth missing